Emily Bold (born 2 March 1980) is a German author who lives in Bavaria. She writes romantic historical novels and stories for young adults, some of which have been translated into English. She became a best selling author in 2011 with Gefährliche Intrigen (Dangerous Intrigue).

Bold has been writing novels since 2008. In May 2011, she published her first novel, Gefährliche Intrigen, on Kindle. As a result, it soon became a best seller. Her other works are also available as eBooks as well as paperbacks. When publishing on Kindle, she handles all the formatting and cover design herself. She also makes use of Facebook and other social media sites to promote the marketing of her works.

Works

English translations
The Curse: Touch of Eternity (The Curse Series), Skyscape, 2013
The Curse: Breath of Yesterday  (The Curse Series Book 2), Skyscape, 2014
Midnight Kisses (Midnight Series Book 1),  Amazon Digital Services
Midnight Tears (Midnight Series Book 2),  Amazon Digital Services
Midnight Dreams (Midnight Series Book 3),  Amazon Digital Services

Windham Series 
 Vergessene Küsse. 2012, .
 Verborgene Tränen. 2013, .
 Verlorene Träume. 2013, .

The Curse 
 Vanoras Fluch. 2012, .
 Im Schatten der Schwestern. 2012, .
 Das Vermächtnis. 2013, .

The Darkest Red
 Aus Nebel geboren. 2013, .
 Von Flammen verzehrt. 2014, .
 Im Dunkel verborgen. 2014, .

Other works 
 Blacksoul – In den Armen des Piraten. 2012, .
 Gefährliche Intrigen. 2012, .
 Mitternachtsfalke – Auf den Schwingen der Liebe. 2012, .
 Zwei Seelen. 2012.
 Klang der Gezeiten. 2014, .

References

External links
Emily Bold's website

1980 births
Living people
Writers from Bavaria
21st-century German novelists
German women novelists
21st-century German women writers